United Nations Security Council Resolution 136, adopted on May 31, 1960, after examining the application of the Togolese Republic for membership in the United Nations, the Council recommended to the General Assembly that the Togolese Republic be admitted.

The resolution was approved unanimously by all 11 members of the Council.

See also
List of United Nations Security Council Resolutions 101 to 200 (1953–1965)

References
Text of the Resolution at undocs.org

External links
 

 0136
History of Togo
Foreign relations of Togo
 0136
1960 in Togo
 0136
May 1960 events